Leicester, England is an ethnically and culturally diverse city. It is the thirteenth most populous city in the United Kingdom.

Population

Leicester's total population, according to the 2011 UK census, was 329,839. The population density was 4,494 people per square km.

Ethnicity

The following table shows the ethnic group of respondents in the 2001 and 2011 censuses in Leicester. The local district has been in a majority-minority state since around 2008 and was reported in the 2011 census to be that, with the White British population at 45% of the population of Leicester. Asian British residents, especially Indians, have risen since post-war migration to the UK began, famously Asians from Uganda who were expelled in 1972. In 1991, Asians as a broad multi-ethnic group made up nearly a quarter of the city's population but have risen to above a third of the population at 37.1%. Black British people have also risen as a group with the increase mostly coming from Black Africans who have risen from 0.3% of the city's population to nearly 4%. 

Notes for table above

Ethnicity of school pupils 
The ethnicity of school pupils within Leicester has been in flux and in a majority-minority state since statistics have been first collected in 2003. For instance, the most profound change can be seen with the White British, who have declined from 45.6% in 2004 to 23.4% in 2022. Asian British school pupils have risen in percentage, going from 37.9% of the areas school pupil population to a near majority (47%). All other groups have grown in size as well. Other White school pupils have risen from 1.7% to 7.8%, Black British school pupils have risen from 6.4% to 10.4% in 2016 but then declined to 9.5% in 2022, Mixed have risen from 5.5% to 7.5% and Other ethnicities have gone from 0.8% to 2.7%.

Country of birth

Languages

The most common main languages spoken in Leicester according to the 2011 census are shown below. There were around over 70 languages or dialects spoken in the city in 2011.

Religion

The following table shows the religion of respondents in the 2001 and 2011 censuses in Leicester. In 2012, almost 240 individual faith groups were reported to being practised in Leicester.

See also

Demography of the United Kingdom
Demography of England
Demography of London
Demography of Birmingham
Demography of Greater Manchester
List of English cities by population
List of English districts by population
List of English districts and their ethnic composition
List of English districts by area
List of English districts by population density

Notes

References

Leicester
Leicester